The Church on the Hill is a historic church building at 169 Main Street in Lenox, Massachusetts.  Built in 1805, it is one of a small number of surviving Federal period churches in the region.  Its congregation, gathered in 1769, belongs to the United Church of Christ, and its offices are located at 55 Main Street.  The church building was listed on the National Register of Historic Places in 1982.

Architecture and building history
The church is located on a rise at the northern end of Lenox village, on the west side of Main Street.  It stands on a parcel  in size that includes the town's first cemetery.  It is a two-story wood frame structure, with a gabled roof and clapboarded exterior.  A gabled entry vestibule projects from the center of the main (south-facing) facade, with the entrance at its center, flanked by pilasters and topped by a gabled pediment.  Above the entrance are a Palladian window and a dentillated gable.  The building corners have fluted pilasters.  A tower rises astride the main block and the vestibule projections, with a square clock-faced stage topped by an open octagonal belfry with paneled pilastered supports.  Above the belfry is an octagonal paneled stage which is crowned by a cupola, finial, and cross.

The meetinghouse was built in 1805 by architect and builder Benjamin D. Goodrich of Richmond, based on designs by Asher Benjamin and Charles Bulfinch. It was dedicated on January 1, 1806. Its total cost was $6,619.00 including furnishings. The building was erected on land near the town's first meetinghouse (built 1770), which it replaced.

The current pastor is the Rev. Elizabeth (Liz) R. Goodman.

A painting of the church, by American Impressionist Clark G Voorhees, is in the collection of the Museum of Fine Arts, Houston.

Ministers 
 1770-1793 Rev. Samuel Munson
 1795-1846 Rev. Samuel Shepard, D.D.
 1846-1854 Rev. Henry Neill
 1854-1859 Rev. Edmund K. Alden
 1860-1865 Rev. Reuben S. Kendall
 1872-1873 Rev. Samuel H. Tolman
 1874-1880 Rev. Charles H. Parkhurst
 1880-1889 Rev. R. DeWitt Mallary
 1890-1898 Rev. Edward Day
 1899-1904 Rev. Frederick Lynch
 1904-1907 Rev. Clayton J. Potter

See also
National Register of Historic Places listings in Berkshire County, Massachusetts

References 
 Centennial Anniversary of the Dedication of the Old Church on the Hill, Lenox, Massachusetts, June 12, 1906

External links
Church on the Hill, Lenox

United Church of Christ churches in Massachusetts
Churches on the National Register of Historic Places in Massachusetts
Churches in Berkshire County, Massachusetts
Buildings and structures in Lenox, Massachusetts
National Register of Historic Places in Berkshire County, Massachusetts